Hakkârigücü is a women's football club founded in 1989 and based in Hakkâri, eastern Turkey. The club president is Kıymet Kurt, and the manager is Cemile Timur. The team play their home matches in the Merzan Stadium.

History 
The women's association football club Hakkârigücü Spor was founded by Cemile Timur, than a 20-year old local woman. A former athletics performer in her high school years, she later developed an interest for association football, and founded the first women's sport club in the city at Southeastern Anatolia Region with strong conservative feudal society after persuading some parents of girls coming from the villages of the province. The team was initially formed with eight girls only. After taking part in the 2007–08 Turkish Girls' Football Championship, the team was qualified the next season to play in Group 4 of the Turkish Women's  Regional Football League. In the 2009–10 season, the team took reached the play-offs for promotion to the Women's Second League, became however, unsuccessful.  They were promoted in the 2011–12 season to the Women' Second League when the Women's Regional League was abolished. They played in total seven seasons in the Second League. Finally, the team became runners-up at the end of the play-offs of the 2017–18 season, and was entitled to play in the Women' First League for the 2018–19 season.

Stadium 
Hakkârigücü Spor play their home matches in the Merzan Football Field. As the dimensions of the football pitch are not standard, and the field lacks bleachers, it has to be improved. In order to meet the requirements of the Turkish Football Federation on grounds for the First League matches, the pitch will be widened , changing rooms and bleachers will be added.

Statistics 
.

(1): Season discontinued due to COVID-19 pandemic in Turkey
(2) Group standing, lost play-offs quarterfinals
(3) Season in progress

Current squad 
.
Head coach:  Cemile Timur

Kit history

Squads

References 

 
1989 establishments in Turkey
Association football clubs established in 1989